Bachtyar Ali Muhammed (born 1960), is a Kurdish novelist, intellectual, literary critic, essayist, and poet. Ali started out as a poet and essayist, but has established himself as an influential novelist from the mid-1990s. He has published thirteen novels, and several collections of poetry and essays.

Since the mid-1990s, Ali has been living in Germany  (Frankfurt, Cologne and most recently Bonn). In his academic essays, he has dealt with various subjects, such as the 1988 Saddam-era Anfal genocide campaign, the relationship between the power and intellectuals and other philosophical issues. He often employs western philosophical concepts to interpret an issue in Kurdish society, modifying or adapting them to his context.

In 2016 his novel Ghezelnus u Baxekani Xeyal ("Ghazalnus and the Gardens of Imagination") was published in English under the title I Stared at the Night of the City. The first Kurdish-language novel to be published in English, it was translated by London-based journalist and translator Kareem Abdulrahman. In the same year, his novel Duwahamin Henari Dunya ("The World's Last Pomegranate") was translated into German by Rawezh Salim and Ute Cantera-Lang under the title Der letzte Granatapfel ("The Last Pomegranate").

Education 

Ali finished his pre-university education in Slemani. He attended Shaykh Salam Primary School, Azmar Secondary School and Halkawt Preparatory School. He started studying Geology at the University of Sulaimani, and later Salahaddin University in Arbil (Kurdish, Hawler:هەولێر), the current capital of Iraq's Kurdistan Region. Ali speaks Kurdish, Arabic, Persian, German, and has a working knowledge of English.

Writing career 

He wrote his first prominent piece of writing in 1983, a long poem called Nishtiman ("The Homeland"; Kurdish; نیشتمان). His first article, titled La parawezi bedangi da ("In the margin of silence") in the Pashkoy, Iraq newspaper in 1989. He started to publish and hold seminars after the 1991 uprising against the Iraqi government, as the Kurds started to establish a de facto semi-autonomous region in parts of Iraqi Kurdistan and enjoy a degree of freedom of speech. He could not have published most of his work before 1991 because of strict political censorship under Saddam.

Along with several other writers of his generation—most notably Mariwan Wirya Qani, Rebin Hardi and Sherzad Hasan—he started a new intellectual movement in Kurdistan, mainly through holding seminars. The same group in 1991 started publishing a philosophical journal, Azadi ("Freedom"; Kurdish:ئازادی), of which only five issues were published, and then Rahand ("Dimension"; Kurdish:رەهەند).

In 1992, he published his first book, a poetry collection titled Gunah w Karnaval ("Sin and the Carnival"; Kurdish:گوناه و کەڕنەڤال). It contained several long poems, some which were written in the late 1980s. His first novel, Margi Taqanay Dwam ("The death of the second only child"; Kurdish:مەرگی تاقانەی دووەم), the first draft of which was written in the late 1980s, was published in 1997.

In 2017, he received the Nelly-Sachs-Preis award, which is only given every other year. It was the first time that the prize was awarded to an author publishing in a non-European language.

Bibliography

Novels
His novels can be categorized as magic realism.

 Mergî Taqaney Diwem (The Death of the Second Only Child), 1997.
 Êwarey Perwane (Parwana's Evening), 1998.
 Diwahemîn Henary Dûnya (The Last Pomegranate of the World), 2002.
 Şary Mosîqare Spiyekan (The City of the White Musicians), 2006.
 Xezelnûs û Baxekanî Xeyal (Ghazalnus and the Gardens of Imagination), 2008.
 Koşkî Balinde Xemgînekan (The Mansion of the Sad Birds), 2009.
 Cemşîd Xany Mamim: Ke Hemîşe Ba Legel Xoyda Deybird (My Uncle Jamshid Khan : Whom the Wind was Always Taking), 2010.
 Keştî Firiştekan – Kiteby Yekem (The Angels' Ship – Book One), 2012.
 Keştî Firiştekan – Kiteby Diwem (The Angels' Ship – Book Two), 2013.
 Hewrekanî Danial  (Danial's Clouds), 2015.
 Keşti Firiştekan – Kiteby Sêyem (The Angels' Ship – Book Three), 2017.
 Deryas û Laşekan (Daryas and the Bodies), 2019
Dagîrkirdinî tarîkî (Conquest in the Dark) 2020

Essays
 Îman û Cengaweranî (Faith and its Warriors), 2004.
 Xwênerî Kûşinde (Fatal Reader), 2005.
 Sêwî Sêhem (Third Apple), 2009.
 Çêjî Merigdostî (The Taste of Mournfluness), 2011.
 Le Diyarewe bo Nadiyar (From Visible to Invisible), 2011.
 Wek Balindey naw Cengele Tirsinakekan (Like the Birds in the Scary Jungles), 2012.
 Awrekey Orfîûos (Orpheus's Turn), 2014.
 Nersîsî Kûjraw (Murdered Narcissus), 2015.
 Rexne le 'Eqlî Faşîsty (Criticizing Fascistic Minds), 2015.
 Ciwaniyekany Nareky (The Beauties of Irregularity), 2015.
 Yadewery û Zemen (Memory and Time), 2015
 Naşwên (Nowhere), 2019.
 Aydolojîst (Ideologist), 2019.
 Opozisîon û Portirêtekany (Opposition and its Portraits), 2019.
 Diwa Xendey Dîktator (The Last Smile of Dictator), 2020.

Poetry
 Gûnah û Kerneval (The Sin and the Carnival), 1992.
 Bohîmy û Estêrekan (Bohemian and the Stars), 2000.
 Koy Berheme Şî'riyekan (Collection of complete works of poetry), 1983–1998.
 Îşkirdin le Daristanekany Fîrdewisda (Working in the Forests of Heaven), 2004.
 Ta Matemî gûl... Ta Xwênî Firişte ('Till the Funeral of Flower... 'Till the Angel's Blood); Complete works (1983–2004).
 Ey Benderî Dost, Ey Keştî Dûjmin (O the Port of Friend, O the Ship of Enemy), 2009.
 Şewêk Asman pir bû le Estêrey Şêt (A Night the Sky was Full of Crazy Stars), 2019.

Others
 Welam le Rojgarî Winbûnî Pirsiyarda (Answers in the Age of Absence of Questions); 13 reviews with the writer, 2003.
 Xorhelat û Lebîrkirawekany (East and its Forgottens), Zanyar Muhammad, 2019.
 Mêjûy Xoberhemhênanewe (The History of Regeneration), Omed Hama Ali, 2019.

Filmography

See also 
 Mariwan Kanie
 Sara Omar
 Nalî
 Mahwi
 Piramerd
 Muhamed Amin Zaki
 Abdulla Goran
 Jamal Nebez
 Sherko Bekas
 Rafiq Hilmi
 Latif Halmat
 Mohammad Hanif (Iranian writer)

Notes

References

External links
 
 Bachtyar Ali's Official Website
 Bachtyar Ali on Instagram
 Bachtyar Ali's page on Facebook
 "A Kurdish imagination" - TLS
 "Kurdish novel re-writes rules" - BBC
 Perpetrators and Victims in Backtiar Ali's Kurdish Novel "The City of White Musicians"
 "The First Kurdish Novel Ever Translated Into English Bridges Politics, Poetry, and Johnny Depp Movies"
 http://www.nrttv.com/en/Details.aspx?Jimare=9839 "British publisher to release first Kurdish novel translated to English"

1966 births
Kurdish academics
University of Sulaymaniyah alumni
People from Sulaymaniyah
Kurdish writers
Kurds in Germany
20th-century Iraqi novelists
Living people
Iraqi Kurdish poets
20th-century Iraqi poets
21st-century Iraqi poets
21st-century Iraqi novelists